Blooming Days is the second Korean extended play and third overall by Exo-CBX, a sub-unit of South Korean boy band Exo. It was released on April 10, 2018, by SM Entertainment and distributed by IRIVER. It contains a total of seven songs including the title track "Blooming Day".

Background
On March 8, SM Entertainment confirmed that Exo's sub-unit Exo-CBX, would be making their Korean comeback in April. And on March 26, it was confirmed that the boy group would be releasing their second extended play on April 10. From March 29 until March April 3, lyrics teasers for the comeback were released through the group's official accounts on Twitter and Instagram.

On April 3, the title of the mini album Blooming Days and its lead single "Blooming Day" were revealed along with the date of its release. On April 4, the track list of the mini-album was released, containing seven songs, including the title track "Blooming Day". On April 5, Chen's teaser for the track "Thursday" was released along with photo teaser of the member. On the same day, the mini-album details were released through the group's official website. On April 6, Baekhyun's teaser for the track "Vroom Vroom" was released along with photo teasers of the member. On April 7, Xiumin's teaser for the track "Playdate" was released, along with photo teasers of the member. On April 8, the music video teaser of "Blooming Day" was released. On April 10, the mini album was officially released along with the title track's "Blooming Day" music video.

Promotion
EXO-CBX began a special relay live schedule starting on April 9, which lasted for seven days.

The group held a live broadcast on April 10 titled "EXO-CBX's Blooming Day!" at the Yes24 Live Hall, where they talked about the album and performed the title track "Blooming Day".

EXO-CBX held fan signing events on April 15 in Seoul at SMTOWN Coex Artium, on April 16 in Busan at BEXCO Convention Hall and in Daegu at Novotel Ambassador Daegu Champagne Hall, on April 19 in Gangnam at Ilchi Art Hall and on April 22 in Goyang at Starfield Goyang.

EXO-CBX began performing the lead single "Blooming Day" on South Korean music shows from April 12 on Mnet's M!Countdown.

Singles
"Blooming Day" was released as the title track in conjunction with the EP on April 10. The song was described as "a light and chic dance-pop track where the members' sweet vocal colors will be showcased. The lyrics talk about a sweet confession to a woman with heart fluttering emotions like spring".

Commercial performance
Blooming Days topped various domestic and global weekly charts including China's Xiami K-Pop chart. On April 19, 2018, it debuted at number one on the Gaon Album Chart.

Track listing

Charts

Weekly charts

Monthly charts

Year-end charts

Sales and certifications

! scope="row"| China (Xiami)
|
|307,506
|-
! scope="row"| Japan (Oricon)
|
|193,513
|-
! scope="row"| South Korea (Gaon)
| 
|534,567
|}

Accolades

Release history

References

Korean-language EPs
SM Entertainment EPs
2018 EPs
Concept albums
Exo-CBX EPs
IRiver EPs
Albums produced by Steve Manovski